Westfield Valley Fair, commonly known as Valley Fair, is a prominent shopping mall in San Jose, California. Valley Fair is the largest mall, by area, in Northern California and has higher sales revenue than all other malls in California, including the two in Southern California which have larger area than Valley Fair. Valley Fair is the thirteenth largest shopping mall in the United States. It is located on Stevens Creek Boulevard in West San Jose (a small portion of the mall is located within Santa Clara). The anchor stores are 2 Macy's stores, Bloomingdale's, and Nordstrom.

Valley Fair consists of 214 stores, including as the only Balenciaga in Northern California, and 58 dining options, such as Eataly and Din Tai Fung.

History

Westfield Valley Fair is unique in that it replaced two separate 1950s-era shopping centers.  The original Valley Fair Shopping Center, opened in 1958, was confined to the eastern side of the property in San Jose. It was developed and anchored by Macy's and included roughly 40 other stores including Joseph Magnin in an outdoor plaza.  At the western side was another outdoor shopping center, Stevens Creek Plaza in Santa Clara. It was anchored by The Emporium and I. Magnin.  For that reason, the current mall contributes sales tax revenues to both the cities of San Jose and Santa Clara, and is regulated by both city governments.

In 1986, both centers were acquired and merged into one two-level enclosed mall by The Hahn Company, creating one of the most successful shopping centers in the country, called simply "Valley Fair".  Nordstrom joined later in 1987, with I. Magnin closing its store in 1992.  The former Emporium store became a second Macy's location in 1996, housing Macy's Men's & Home Store. The former I. Magnin housed a succession of tenants, its final one being Sports Authority, before being demolished and replaced by a Showplace ICON cinema which opened in 2019 and a Bowlero bowling alley which will open in 2022.

In 1998, Westfield America, Inc., a predecessor of the Westfield Group and The Rouse Company acquired Valley Fair jointly from Hahn.  Westfield bought out Rouse in 1999 and brought in an institutional investment partner to share its investment risk in this high-profile property.  In 1998 the property was renamed Westfield Shoppingtown Valley Fair. Westfield discontinued the "Shoppingtown" moniker in 2005.

The mall commenced a $165 million two-phase expansion project in 2001, which began with the addition of a new second-level Dining Terrace, 80 new stores, three multi-level parking garages, and the relocation of the property's Nordstrom store to a new three-level, 230,000 square-foot store to the northwest of its original store. Phase Two brought the redevelopment of the former Nordstrom store and food court into an additional 30 stores, including a wing of shops facing the bordering Forest Avenue, and the addition of a Cheesecake Factory restaurant.

A major remodel of the center commenced in 2013, bringing the mall a revamped "Dining Terrace" with local concepts alongside national chains, and a major reshuffling of tenants. Nordstrom was extensively remodeled, adding two new restaurant concepts and a completely revamped store design. The mall's lower level Nordstrom wing was reconfigured into a "Luxury Collection", with new luxury tenants like Balenciaga, Mulberry, Saint Laurent Paris, Bottega Veneta, Versace, Giorgio Armani, Tory Burch, Salvatore Ferragamo, and Prada joining existing tenants Louis Vuitton and Tiffany & Co.

In 2012, San Jose raised its minimum wage to $10 USD an hour, but Santa Clara did not, leading to what the NPR Planet Money team dubbed "A Mall Divided," where workers on one side of the mall were being paid $2 less than the other side. A Gap clothing store located on the two city lines was required to either account for how long its employees spent in each city or raise its wages for all employees to the San Jose minimum wage; they chose to raise the wages.

Expansion

Westfield was granted approval for the expansion by the city of San Jose in November 2007. It was to be completed by September 2011. However, the plans were postponed in May 2009 due to an ongoing recession.

In early 2015, Westfield unveiled a new proposal for a $1.1 billion expansion, which called for the addition of a three-level 150,000 square foot Bloomingdale's department store, a Showplace ICON luxury cinema, and the addition 500,022 square feet of new interior shop space, adding over 100 new stores, including an outdoor restaurant collection fronting Stevens Creek Boulevard, and 3,000+ new parking spaces.

The expansion and Bloomingdale's had its grand opening on March 5, 2020, creating a third interior thoroughfare and an outdoor dining district. Several retailers opened in the months following the expansion, including relocated and larger Apple and Tiffany & Co. flagship retail stores, with a 45,000 square-foot Eataly food hall and market planned for the wing as well. Eataly opened on June 16, 2022.

References

External links

  at Westfield 
History of Valley Fair Shopping Center
 
 New Westfield Valley Fair Redevelopment Project

Buildings and structures in San Jose, California
Shopping malls in the San Francisco Bay Area
Valley Fair
Economy of San Jose, California
Shopping malls established in 1986